Felix Hebert (December 11, 1874December 14, 1969) was a United States senator from Rhode Island. Born near St-Hyacinthe, Quebec, Canada, he came to the United States when his parents, Edouard and Catherine (Vandale) Hebert, returned in 1880 and resumed their residence in the town of Coventry, Rhode Island. He was the first person of French-Canadian ancestry to serve in the United States Senate.

Early life, education, and career
Born on at St. Guillaume, Quebec, where his parents were visiting to tend to his father's health, the family returned to Coventry, where Hebert was educated in the public schools. He then attended La Salle Academy in Providence, from which he graduated in 1893. He was employed as a railroad freight billing clerk from 1893 to 1896 and as a private secretary to General Charles R. Brayton from 1896 to 1898. He received an appointment as clerk in the office of Treasurer Walter A. Read, where he worked for one year. He was deputy insurance commissioner of Rhode Island from 1898 to 1906, studied law, was admitted to the bar in 1907 and commenced practice in Providence.

Judicial and political service
He was justice of the district court of the fourth judicial district of Rhode Island from 1908 to 1928, trustee of the Nathanael Greene Homestead Association of Rhode Island from 1924 to 1934, and a member and secretary of the Providence County Courthouse Commission from 1925 to 1934.

Hebert was elected as a Republican to the U.S. Senate, unseating Democrat Peter G. Gerry by a 51% to 49% margin.  He served from March 4, 1929, to January 3, 1935; he was an unsuccessful candidate for reelection in 1934, losing a rematch to Gerry, who won 57% of the vote. In 1931, he travelled to Europe to examine European unemployment compensation systems, returning to the U.S. to advise President Herbert Hoover against federal unemployment compensation. While in the Senate, he was Republican whip from 1933 to 1935, and chairman of the Committee on Patents (Seventy-second Congress). He resumed the practice of law, was a member of the Republican National Committee from 1944 to 1952, and was advisory counsel to the Associated Factory Mutual Fire Insurance Companies. He was considered an "international authority on insurance law". He died in Warwick in 1969; interment was in St. Joseph's Cemetery, West Warwick.

Personal life
Hebert had thirteen siblings including Rev. Mathias A. Hebert, who on December 16, 1922 was appointed by Bishop William A. Hickey as the second pastor of St. Cecilia Parish of Pawtucket, Rhode Island. Hebert was a Roman Catholic and was a member of the parish of St. Jean Baptiste, Arctic Centre, of which his father was one of the founders.  He was a member of various societies and clubs, including the Catholic Club, and the Turk's Head Club of Providence.

Hebert married Virginia M. Provost, a daughter of Octave and Virginie (Deslauriers) Provost, of Ware, Massachusetts, where the wedding was performed on September 18, 1900. They had four children: Catherine Virginia, Adrien Warner, Marguerite Rosalie, and Edouard Felix.

References

|-

|-

|-

|-

1874 births
1969 deaths
American people of French-Canadian descent
Canadian emigrants to the United States
La Salle Academy alumni
Republican Party United States senators from Rhode Island
Rhode Island Republicans
Rhode Island state court judges